Michael Marcus Morgan, better known as Michael Marcus, is an English actor. He is best known for his portrayal of Henry Tudor in the TV series The White Queen (2013). He also had supporting roles in The Physician (2013) and The Theory of Everything (2014).

Career 
In 2011 Marcus appeared in two episodes of the third season of Misfits as Peter, an avid comic book reader with the power of Future Illustration. He later appeared in the ten-part BBC One historical drama The White Queen, the 2013 adaptation of Philippa Gregory's novels in The Cousins' War series. Marcus played the role of Henry Tudor, the Lancastrian claimant to the throne who later started the line of Tudor monarchs.

In early April 2014 it was announced that Marcus would play the lead role of Valentine in the Royal Shakespeare Company's production of The Two Gentlemen of Verona. Marcus described his character as a man "who sort of seems to be running away from something rather than going towards something. But I think [he] tries to convince himself that actually what he wants is out there in Milan and not at home".

Filmography

Film

Television

Theater

References

External links 
 

English male television actors
Living people
Year of birth missing (living people)